The 2012 Oceania Weightlifting Championships took place at the Faleata Sports Complex in Apia, Samoa from 6 to 9 June 2012. Together with that year's Commonwealth Championships, they were held concurrently as a single event designated the 2012 Oceania & Commonwealth Weightlifting Championships.

Medal summary
Results shown below are for the senior competition only. Junior and youth results are cited here and here respectively.

Medal table

Men

Women

References

External links
Senior results book
Junior results book
Youth results book

Weightlifting competitions
Oceania Weightlifting Championships
Oceania Weightlifting Championships
International weightlifting competitions hosted by Samoa
Sports competitions in Apia
Oceania Weightlifting Championships